Ángel Luis Robles Berengüí (born 20 April 1982) is a Spanish footballer who plays for FC Jumilla as a central defender.

Club career
Born in Cehegín, Murcia, Robles graduated from Real Madrid's youth setup. He made his senior debuts with the C-team, playing several seasons in the Tercera División. He was promoted to the reserves in the Segunda División B in June 2003, and appeared in 22 matches during the promotion campaign.

Robles played his first match as a professional on 17 September 2005, coming on as a second-half substitute in a 1–2 home loss against CD Tenerife in the Segunda División. He appeared in 14 matches during the season, and subsequently joined SD Ponferradina in the same division in July of the following year.

In the 2007 summer Robles joined Lorca Deportiva CF in the third level. He continued to appear in the same division in the following campaigns, representing UD Alzira, CD Roquetas, CD Dénia, UCAM Murcia CF and FC Jumilla.

References

External links
 
 
 
 

1982 births
Living people
Spanish footballers
Footballers from the Region of Murcia
Association football defenders
Segunda División players
Segunda División B players
Tercera División players
Real Madrid C footballers
Real Madrid Castilla footballers
Lorca Deportiva CF footballers
UD Alzira footballers
UCAM Murcia CF players
FC Jumilla players